Pe Khin (27 August 1912 – 25 February 2004) was a Burmese diplomat. He was one of the main negotiators at the Panglong Conference in Burma and the architect of the historical Panglong Agreement.

Early life 
Pe Khin was born in Swehman village, Pyawbwe Township of Mandalay Division to A.A. Khan (U Bo Galay) and Daw Toke on 27 August 1912. He studied Urdu at Swe Hman village Primary School and passed the fourth standard examination.

He passed the seventh standard examination at Pyawbwe Township's Wesleyan School and matriculation examination at the Kelly School in Mandalay. He also stayed at the Bago Hostel, together with future founder of modern Burma Aung San, and received a B.A. and B.L. from Rangoon University. He worked at the labour office in the Chauk Petroleum oil field in 1938.

Political beginnings 
In January 1946, he attended the first convention of the Anti-Fascist People's Freedom League (AFPFL) as a delegate from the Burma Muslim Congress. The seventh proposal at the convention was made by Pe Khin, who proposed that the frontier areas and ethnic groups be joined together with the Burmese interim government to achieve independence. It became one of the main points of the Panglong Agreement. Pe Khin later became a Central Executive Member of the AFPFL and was appointed as their secretary for ethnic minorities in Burma.

He was elected as a Member of Parliament representing the Phaw Bawl Township in the April 1947 constituent assembly elections. He was the main lobbyist behind a letter by Mandalay leaders requesting that Aung San appoint U Razak for a cabinet post.

After Aung San left the Panglong Conference disappointed and frustrated on 12 April 1947, Pe Khin was able to persuade Aung San to stay for another night and to allow him to negotiate with the ethnic minority leaders. Pe Khin successfully negotiated with them and so, U Aung Zan Wai, Bo Khin Maung Galay, U Pe Khin, Bo Hmu Aung, Sir Maung Gyi, Dr. Sein Mya Maung, Myoma U Than Kywe all signed the subsequent Panglong Agreement, an important document which would eventually lead to independence from the British and the creation of the Union of Burma.

Aung San and several members of his cabinet were killed while meeting in the Secretariat on 19 July 1947, in an assassination orchestrated by U Saw, a conservative pre-war Prime Minister of Burma. Pe Khin then became a minister in the newly formed cabinet of Thakin Nu.

Diplomatic career 
Pe Khin was appointed as Burma's first Ambassador to Pakistan in 1947. He was then sent as the Ambassador to Thailand from 1953 to 1956. In 1964 he was transferred to the Soviet Union and in 1966 to Singapore. After 25 years of diplomatic service he retired in 1972.

Activities in NGOs 
Pe Khin was active in the Burma Muslim Congress from 1945, together with U Razak and Khin Maung Latt. He was also a patron of the Burma Islamic Council and Burmese Muslim Organization.

Published books 
 Panglong, An Inside Story
 AFPFL convention
 Seed of the Panglong Conference
 Burma and the Non-aligned policy
 ... and numerous articles in English and Burmese

Awards 
 "Maha Tharaesithu" in the First Honours list given out by the Burmese government after independence.
 Country's Honour First Grade on 7 June 1980.

References 

1912 births
2004 deaths
Burmese Muslims
University of Yangon alumni
Muslim activists
Anti-Fascist People's Freedom League politicians
Ambassadors of Myanmar to Pakistan
Ambassadors of Myanmar to Thailand
Ambassadors of Myanmar to Cambodia
Ambassadors of Myanmar to Laos
Ambassadors of Myanmar to the Soviet Union
Ambassadors of Myanmar to Poland
Ambassadors of Myanmar to Malaysia
Ambassadors of Myanmar to Singapore
Ambassadors of Myanmar to Czechoslovakia
People from Mandalay Region
Burmese people of Indian descent
Burmese Muslim activists